The Navotas National High School (NNHS) is founded on 1983 by Mayor Victor Javier. With a  land area, it is located on Barangay Sipac Almacen, Navotas, Metro Manila, Philippines. This school used to be called Navotas Municipal High School.

See also
Navotas
Navotas Polytechnic College

References

Schools in Navotas
Educational institutions established in 1983
High schools in Metro Manila
1983 establishments in the Philippines
Public schools in Metro Manila